Annie Francé-Harrar (born 2 December 1886 Munich, Germany; died 23 January 1971 Hallein, Austria) was an Austrian writer and scientist.

Francé-Harrar created the scientific basis for the humus-compost-economy[imperfect literal translation from German] together with her second husband Raoul Heinrich Francé. During her life she wrote 47 books, some 5000 articles in the German press, and held over 500 lectures and courses, including radio broadcasts.

At a young age she combined her artistic and literary talent with technical research. The first printed work appeared in 1911 and described in verses the lives of women over the centuries. In the same year she first married, but after only six years this marriage ended in divorce. In 1916 she met Raoul H. Francé, director of the Biological Institute in Munich, and became his assistant. 1920 the first utopian novel The fire souls described the problem of the destruction of soil fertility. After the divorce from her first husband, she married Francé in Dinkelsbühl 1923. In 1924 the couple settled down in Salzburg. There she wrote – based on impressions and research – a book about the famous doctor Paracelsus, who had died in this city 1541. The period to 1930 was the first group of overseas travels, the occasion for a series of monographs. With regard to the health of her husband, increasingly frequent stays in Ragusa (today's Dubrovnik) on the southern Adriatic coast followed. From there the couple fled in the turmoil of the Second World War to Budapest in 1943, where Raoul Heinrich Francé died in the same year – a leukemia had been recognized too late. After the end of the Second World War Annie Francé-Harrar began with the construction of a breeding station for the transformation of urban waste in Budapest in the summer of 1945 and developed the first Impfziegel (bioreactor) for composting.

In 1947 she returned to Austria. At the Bavarian Agriculture Publishers her work appeared in 1950 with the title The Last Chance – for a future without need, which was well received and popular. Even Albert Einstein admired this work and said it would have a permanent place in world literature. As a result of the book The Last Chance she was appointed on behalf of the government in Mexico and supported the country for nine years to set up a large humus organization in the fight against erosion and soil degradation. As a result of almost 40 years of work, in 1958 the book Humus – soil life and fertility was published. After several intermediate stops in Europe she returned in 1961 to their home. She was still actively working in the World Union for Protection of Life and other organizations. She spent her last years in the pension Schloss Kahlsberg, where she died in January 1971 after a short illness at 85 years of age. On January 26 she was buried at the side of her husband in Oberalm-Hallein.

Works 

 Die Kette, 1911
 Die Feuerseelen, 1920

Der Glaserne Regen - Novel - J.P. Toth Verlag, Hamburg 1948

 Die letzte Chance – Für eine Zukunft ohne Not. München 1950

Und Eines Tages-  J.P. Toth Verlag, Hamburg 1952

 Humus – Bodenleben und Fruchtbarkeit. München 1958

So War's um Neunzehnhundert: Mein Fin De  Seicle- Albert Langen - Georg Muller Verlag, Munchen, 1962

Frag Nicht Woher Die Liebe Kommt - Roman- Langen Muller, Munchen 1967

External links 
 Multilingual Website

1886 births
1971 deaths
Scientists from Munich
Austrian women biologists
Austrian scientists
20th-century women scientists
German emigrants to Austria